Aradhana is a 1976 Indian Telugu-language romantic musical film directed by B. V. Prasad. It stars N. T. Rama Rao and Vanisri, with music composed by Saluri Hanumantha Rao. It is produced by produced by A. Pundarikakshayya under the Sri Bhaskara Chitra banner. The film was a remake of the Hindi film Geet (1970).

Plot 
The film begins at an idyllic mountain area where resides a virtuous Gopi dwell with his sister Janaki by rearing goats. He has an incredible innate ability to sing & playing the flute. Once, Radha a famous stage artist & singer visits therein, gets fascinated by Gopi’s talent and they crush. As of now, Radha requests Gopi to accompany her to mold him as a personage which he denies. Since he believes music is God's gift and which is not for sale. So, Radha affirms to reside with him in the village. Soon after her return, she discloses her decision which enrages Sudhakar the company propretor as he longs to knit her. Meanwhile, Gopi fixes an alliance for Janaki which is disrupted due to dowry when sets his mind to winning money at any cost and migrates to the city. Here, with Radha’s support, he turns into a luminary and imposingly performs Janaki’s wedlock. 

Following, Gopi & Radha bedecks to nuptial when begrudged Sudhakar drives to kill Gopi. Whereat, he survives, losing his voice, yet, Radha states to splice him though her father Dasaradaramayya opposes it. In the further step, Sudhakar slaughters Dasaradaramayya and incriminates Gopi which Radha too believes. Currently, she pleads with Sudhakar to acquit Gopi which he accepts provided Radha should espouse him and she agrees to it. Therefore, Radha expels Gopi who lands at his sister's residence. However, he has been deserted therefrom as Sudhakar divulges the actuality. Then, he enrolls as a laborer like this his owner gazes at his potential of performing the flute and invites him to play on the radio. Forthwith, Sudhakar intrigues to eliminate him. Anyhow, Gopi escapes retrieving his voice again, proves himself as nonguilty, and ceases Sudhakar. Finally, the movie ends on a happy note with the reunion of Gopi & Radha who are proceeding to the village.

Cast 
N. T. Rama Rao as Gopi
Vanisri as Radha
Jaggayya as Sudhakar
Gummadi as Dasaradha Ramayya
Prabhakar Reddy
Rajanala as Doctor
Sakshi Ranga Rao as Driver
Mada Venkateswara Rao as Cook
K. V. Chalam
Jaya Bhaskar
Vijayalalitha as Janaki
Suryakala
Pushpa Kumari
Parvathi
Anupama
P. J. Sarma

Soundtrack 
Music composed by Saluri Hanumantha Rao. The song "Mere Mitwa Mere Meet Re" from the original film was retained here as "Naa Madi Ninnu Pilichindi".

References

External links 
 

1970s romantic musical films
1970s Telugu-language films
1976 films
Indian romantic musical films
Telugu remakes of Hindi films